Gustavo Bucaro (born 26 August 1974) is a Guatemalan former swimmer who competed in the 1992 Summer Olympics.

References

1974 births
Living people
Guatemalan male swimmers
Guatemalan male freestyle swimmers
Male butterfly swimmers
Olympic swimmers of Guatemala
Swimmers at the 1992 Summer Olympics
20th-century Guatemalan people
21st-century Guatemalan people